The 2022–23 Saint Mary's Gaels men's basketball team represented Saint Mary's College of California during the 2022–23 NCAA Division I men's basketball season. The team was led by head coach Randy Bennett in his 22nd season at Saint Mary's. The Gaels played their home games at the University Credit Union Pavilion in Moraga, California, as members of the West Coast Conference (WCC).

Previous season
The Gaels finished the 2021–22 season 26–8, 12–3 in WCC play to finish in second place. In the WCC tournament, they defeated Santa Clara in the semifinals before losing to Gonzaga in the championship. They received an at-large bid to the NCAA tournament as the No. 5 seed in the East region. There they defeated Indiana in the first round before losing to UCLA in the second round.

Offseason

Departures

Incoming transfers

2022 recruiting class

Roster

Schedule and results

|-
!colspan=12 style=| Regular season

|-
!colspan=12 style=| WCC tournament

 
|-
!colspan=12 style=| NCAA tournament

Source

Rankings

*''AP does not release post-NCAA Tournament rankings.

Notes

References

Saint Mary's
Saint Mary's Gaels men's basketball seasons
Saint Mary's
Saint Mary's
Saint Mary's